Caronia (Sicilian: Carunìa, Greek:  (Ptol.) or   (Diod. et al.), Latin: Calacte or Cale Acte) is a town and comune on the north coast of Sicily, in the province of Messina, about half way between Tyndaris (modern Tindari) and Cephaloedium (modern Cefalù). The town has 3,555 inhabitants.

History
Kale Akte (or Caleacte, Calacta, Calacte) derived its name from the beauty of the neighboring country; the whole of this strip of coast between the Montes Heraei and the sea being called by the Greek settlers from an early period, the Fair Shore ( – he Kale Akte). Its beauty and fertility had attracted the particular attention of the Zanclaeans, who in consequence invited the Samians and Milesians (after the capture of Miletus by the Persians, 494 BC) to establish themselves on this part of the Sicilian coast. Events, however, turned their attention elsewhere, and they ended with occupying Zancle itself. At a later period the project was resumed by the Sikel leader Ducetius, who, after his expulsion from Sicily by Syracuse and his exile at Corinth, returned at the head of a body of colonists from the Peloponnese; and having obtained much support from the neighbouring Siculi, especially from Archonides, dynast of Herbita, according to Diodorus Siculus founded a city on the coast, which was called Kalè Akté (The Fair Shore or Beautiful Coast).  The date given by Diodorus is 446 BC, but in another passus the same author says that Ducetius colonised Kale Akte in 440 BC, the same year he died. In addition, recent excavations at Caronia, which is clearly the site of the Hellenistic and Roman town  Kale Akte, have revealed only very sparse remains from the 5th century BC, and show that a Sikel settlement already existed here in the early 5th century BC. It is possible that Ducetius founded the colony on the site of this already existing Sikel settlement, just as he had done at Menai and Paliké.

Some scholars have hypothesised that Ducetius returned without the consent of Syracuse, but this is very improbable. He must have had the permission of Syracuse to end the exile at Corinth (the mother city of Syracuse), and he brought according to Diodorus partly Corinthian settlers for the colonising project at Kale Akte. Syracuse would have had an interest of establishing an allied Sikel-Greek colony on the north coast, without risking too much in a potentially hostile Sikel-dominated area.

There are little subsequent account of its fortunes. It appears to have been in Cicero's time a considerable municipal town. Silius Italicus speaks of it as abounding in fish, litus piscosa Calacte and its name, though omitted by Pliny, is found in Ptolemy, as well as in the Antonine Itineraries; but there is considerable difficulty in regard to its position. The distances given in the Tabula Peutingeriana, however (12 M. P. from Alaesa, and 30 M. P. from Cephaloedium), coincide with the site of the modern town of Caronia, on the shore below which Fazello tells us that ruins and vestiges of an ancient city were still visible in his time. Cluverius, who visited Caronia, speaks with admiration of the beauty and pleasantness of this part of the coast, littoris excellens amoenitas et pulchritudo, which rendered it fully worthy of its ancient name.

The Greek rhetorician Caecilius of Caleacte, who flourished in the time of Augustus, was a native of Caleacte, whence he derived the surname of Calactinus.

Official investigations suggested that all of these fires were cases of arson and arrests were made in 2015. However, persistent speculation has ascribed the fires to other natural and supernatural causes. From January to August 2004, appliances, including a television,  a cooker and vacuum cleaner, were reported to have caught fire spontaneously. Fires also reportedly struck wedding presents and a piece of furniture. At least one person was said to have observed an unplugged electrical cable ignite spontaneously. the outbreaks reportedly continued after ENEL, the Italian power utility, cut off the town's power supply. In 2008 investigators concluded that the 2004–2005 fires were caused by arson. Mysterious fires again occurred in mid-2014. On March 5, 2015 police arrested and charged Giuseppe Pezzino, 26, with arson, conspiracy to commit fraud, and sounding a false alarm in association with the mysterious fires. His father, Antonino Pezzino, has also been implicated. The Italian military police had installed hidden cameras in the streets after the fires started again (July 2014). Video captured about 40 incidents implicating Giuseppe (and occasionally, Antonino). Further evidence was gathered by phone taps.

References

Sources

Municipalities of the Metropolitan City of Messina
Ancient cities in Sicily
Milesian colonies
Zanclean colonies
Ruins in Italy